Piyadassi Maha Thera (8 July 1914 – 18 August 1998) was a preacher of the Dhamma both in Sinhala and in English. He was born on 8 July 1914 at Kotahena in Colombo, Sri Lanka and was educated at Nalanda College, Colombo, thereafter at the University of Sri Lanka and the Center for the Study of World Religions at Harvard University as a research student.

At the age of twenty, he entered the Buddhist monastic order under Pelene Siri Vajiragnana Nayaka Thera, founder of the Vajirarama Bambalapitiya. Later, he received his higher ordination under the tutorship of Vajiranna, founding superior of the Vajirarama Colombo.

Piyadassi Maha Thera was the Sinhala editor at the Buddhist Publication Society until his death. Along with Nyanaponika Thera, he was one of the chief kalyāṇamittas of American scholar-monk Bhikkhu Bodhi.

Venerable Piyadassi Maha Thera lived to the age of 84 years and died on 18 August 1998.

Literature
 Piyadassi Thera - The Buddha's Ancient Path
 Piyadassi Thera - The Book of Protection - Paritta
 Piyadassi Thera - Buddhism: a Living Message
A Felicitation Volume presented to THE VEN. NĀRADA MAHATHERA. 1979. Edited by Piyadassi Thera

Wheel Publications (BPS)
The Seven Factors Of Enlightenment: Satta Bojjhanga (WH001)
Buddha—His Life and Teaching (WH005)
Dependent Origination: Paticca-samuppada (WH015)
Lamp of the Law (WH038) (co-authored with Soma Thera)
Psychological Aspect of Buddhism (WH179)

Bodhi Leaf Publications (BPS)
Four Sacred Shrines (BL08)
Aspects of Buddhism (BL21)
Buddhist Observances and Practices (BL48)
The Story of Mahinda, Saṅghamittā and the Sri Mahā-Bodhi (BL57)
The Elimination of Anger (BL68)
Selections From the Dhammapada: Sayings of the Buddha
The Threefold Division of the Noble Eightfold Path (BL32)

References
 

 By A. G. S. Kariyawasam 

1914 births
1998 deaths
Sri Lankan Buddhist monks
Harvard University alumni
Alumni of Nalanda College, Colombo
Sri Lankan Buddhist missionaries
Sri Lankan Theravada Buddhists
20th-century Buddhist monks